Platani may refer to:
 Platani, Cyprus, a village in the Famagusta District, Cyprus
 Platani, Achaea, a village in the municipal unit of Rio, Achaea, Greece
 Platani, Pella, a village in Edessa, Pella, Greece
 Platani (river), a river in southern Sicily, Italy

See also
 San Biagio Platani, a municipality in the Province of Agrigento, Sicily, Italy